Salih Gjuka (1876-1925) was an Albanian teacher and activist of the Albanian National Awakening. The first teacher of Albanian in the Ottoman gymnasium of Uskub, in 1912 he became one of the signatories of the Albanian Declaration of Independence and member of the assembly of the Independent Albania as representative of Pejë. During its session held on 4 December 1912 the Assembly of Vlorë elected Gjuka to be a member of the Senate of Albania. In 1913 he served as the head of the education department of the district of Berat, where he died in 1925.

References

19th-century Albanian educators
20th-century Albanian educators
Signatories of the Albanian Declaration of Independence
Politicians from Peja
People from Kosovo vilayet
1876 births
1925 deaths
Activists of the Albanian National Awakening
People from Berat
All-Albanian Congress delegates
Tuberculosis deaths in Albania
Albanians from the Ottoman Empire